Andrzej Kokowski (born 1953) is a Polish archaeologist who is a Professor of Archaeology and Director of the Institute of Archaeology at Maria Curie-Skłodowska University.

Biography
Andrzej Kokowski was born in Złotów in 1953. He received his PhD from the Adam Mickiewicz University in Poznań in 1996 with a thesis on the Wielbark culture. Since 2000, Kokowski has been Professor of Archaeology at Maria Curie-Skłodowska University. He is the Founder and Director of the Institute of Archaeology at Maria Curie-Skłodowska University. 

Kokowski specializes in the archaeology of Poland in the Pre-Roman Iron Age and the Roman Iron Age, particularly cultures associated with the Goths, Vandals and Sarmatians, on which he has managed numerous projects. Kokowski is an internationally renowned authority on Gothic migrations. He is a fellow of the Alexander von Humboldt Foundation and the author of hundreds of scientific publications. Kokowski was awarded the Gold Cross of Merit in 2007, and the Knight's Cross of the Order of Polonia Restituta in 2014.

Selected works
 Lubelszczyzna w młodszym okresie przedrzymskim i w okresie rzymskim (Lublin 1991)
 Gródek nad Bugiem: cmentarzysko grupy masłomęckiej (Lublin 1993)
 Grupa masłomęcka. Z badań nad przemianami kultury Gotów w młodszym okresie rzymskim (Lublin 1995)
 Archeologia Gotów. Goci w Kotlinie Hrubieszowskiej (Lublin 1999)
 Starożytna Polska. Od trzeciego wieku przed narodzeniem Chrystusa do schyłku starożytności (2005)
 Goci. Od Skandzy do Campi Gothorum (od Skandynawii do Półwyspu Iberyjskiego) (2007)
 30 powodów do dumy z mieszkania w krainie Gotów (Lublin 2007)
 Przygoda z archeologią, czyli najstarsze dzieje Krajny Złotowskiej (do czasów lokacji miasta Złotowa) (Warszawa 2011)

See also
 Jerzy Kolendo
 Marek Olędzki
 Ryszard Wołągiewicz
 Kazimierz Godłowski

References

1953 births
Adam Mickiewicz University in Poznań alumni
20th-century Polish archaeologists
Knights of the Order of Polonia Restituta
Living people
People from Złotów
Recipients of the Gold Cross of Merit (Poland)
21st-century Polish archaeologists
Academic staff of Maria Curie-Skłodowska University